Virginia Gayle Madsen (born September 11, 1961) is an American actress and film producer. She made her film debut in Class (1983), which was filmed in her native Chicago. After she moved to Los Angeles, director David Lynch cast her as Princess Irulan in the science fiction film Dune (1984). Madsen then starred in a series of successful teen movies, including Electric Dreams (1984), Modern Girls (1986), and Fire with Fire (1986).

Madsen received further recognition for her starring role as Helen Lyle in the horror film Candyman (1992). For her performance in Alexander Payne's comedy-drama Sideways (2004), Madsen was nominated for the Academy Award for Best Supporting Actress.

On television, Madsen has appeared in the comedy-drama series Moonlighting (1989), the comedy series Frasier (1998), the period drama series American Dreams (2002–2003), the murder mystery series Monk (2002–2009), the science fiction series The Event (2011), the supernatural drama series Witches of East End (2013–2014), the political thriller series Designated Survivor (2016–2017), and the DC Universe superhero horror series Swamp Thing (2019).

Early life
Virginia Gayle Madsen was born in Chicago, Illinois, the daughter of Elaine (née Melson), who became an Emmy Award-winning filmmaker and author, and Calvin Christian Madsen, a firefighter. After Madsen's parents divorced in the late 1960s, when the children were young, her mother left a career in finance to pursue a career in arts, encouraged by film critic Roger Ebert. Madsen's siblings are Michael Madsen, an actor, and Cheryl Madsen, an entrepreneur. Her paternal grandparents were Danish, and her mother has English, Irish, Scottish, German and distant Native American ancestry. Madsen is a graduate of New Trier High School in Winnetka, Illinois.

Madsen later attended the Ted Liss Acting Studio in Chicago, and Harand Camp Adult Theater Seminar in Elkhart Lake, Wisconsin. Of her experience with Liss, she said: "I had wanted to join his class since I was 12. It was well worth the wait because I don't think I could have got that sort of training anywhere else especially in the United States... I always wanted to make a real career out of acting."

Career

Film
Madsen made her acting debut at age 22, in a bit part where she landed her role as Lisa in the comedy film Class (1983). She next appeared in Kenny Loggins' music video for "I'm Free (Heaven Helps the Man)" from the Footloose soundtrack.

She portrayed a cellist named Madeline in Electric Dreams (1984). She was cast as Princess Irulan in David Lynch's science fiction epic Dune (1984). In 1986, she starred as Boris (Vincent Spano)'s romantic interest Barbara in the film Creator, which also starred Peter O'Toole.

Madsen first became popular with audiences in 1986 with her portrayal of a Catholic school girl who fell in love with a boy from a prison camp in Duncan Gibbons' Fire with Fire. As beauty queen Dixie Lee Boxx, she was the love interest of minor league baseball manager Cecil "Stud" Cantrell (William Petersen) in the HBO original film Long Gone (1987). That same year she also appeared in the music video for "I Found Someone" by Cher. She played a secretary named Allison Rowe in the comedy film Hot to Trot (1988). She also starred as Helen Lyle in the horror film Candyman (1992).

She appeared in a small role in the Francis Ford Coppola drama The Rainmaker (1997) alongside Matt Damon and Claire Danes. Virginia Madsen as a witness for the plaintiff".

Madsen delivered a critically acclaimed performance in Sideways (2004), directed by Alexander Payne. Her role catapulted her onto the Hollywood A-list.

Her first major role after Sideways was opposite Harrison Ford in Firewall. She later appeared in Robert Altman's A Prairie Home Companion, in a key role as the angel. She co-starred alongside Jim Carrey in The Number 23 and Billy Bob Thornton in The Astronaut Farmer; both films were released in North America on February 23, 2007. She voiced Queen Hippolyta, mother of Wonder Woman, in the animated film Wonder Woman (2009).

Television
In 1988, Madsen appeared as Maddie Hayes' cousin in the fifth and final season of the ABC drama series Moonlighting. She has since made various television appearances, including Star Trek: Voyager, CSI: Miami, Dawson's Creek, The Practice, Frasier, and other television series. She was also co-host of the long-running television series Unsolved Mysteries in 1999, during the show's eleventh season (which was also the second and final season on CBS). She starred alongside Ray Liotta in the short-lived CBS crime drama series Smith. She also had a recurring role in the eighth and final season in the USA Network comedy-drama series Monk.

In 2010, she landed the starring role of Cheryl West in the ABC comedy-drama series Scoundrels. In December 2010, it was announced that she would be joining the cast in the NBC science fiction series The Event. In 2012, she joined the cast of the AMC western drama series Hell on Wheels as Mrs. Hannah Durant, first appearing in episode eight of season 2, "The Lord's Day". In 2013, Madsen began appearing on Lifetime's Witches of East End as Penelope Gardiner, the main villainess of the first season.

She starred as Speaker Kimble Hookstraten in the first season of the ABC political drama series Designated Survivor.

Producer
In 2008, she formed her own film production company called Title IX Productions. Her first project was a film made with her mother titled I Know a Woman Like That. The film is a documentary about the lives of older women. On the creation of the film, she said her mother's active lifestyle was an inspiration to start filming.

My mother's level of activity, of productivity, was exactly why I thought a project like this would work. Originally, when we put the idea together, she had said, "I'm far too busy. I'm going to Holland, and then I'm going here and there and I'm writing my book." But that's really what it's about.

Personal life
Madsen was married to actor and director Danny Huston after meeting on the set of Mr. North (1988). They married in 1989 and divorced in 1992. Madsen was in a long-term relationship with Antonio Sabàto Jr. from 1993 to 1998, with whom she has one son.

Filmography

Film

Television

Awards and nominations

References

External links

 
 
 
 

1961 births
Living people
20th-century American actresses
21st-century American actresses
Actresses from Chicago
American film actresses
American people of Danish descent
American people of English descent
American people of German descent
American people of Irish descent
American people of Scottish descent
American people who self-identify as being of Native American descent
American television actresses
American voice actresses
Huston family
Independent Spirit Award for Best Supporting Female winners
New Trier High School alumni
Outstanding Performance by a Cast in a Motion Picture Screen Actors Guild Award winners